Panasonic Lumix DMC-FX150 is a digital camera by Panasonic Lumix. The highest-resolution pictures it records is 14.7 megapixels, through its 28-100mm Leica DC VARIO-ELMARIT.

Property
Intelligent Auto Mode
LEICA DC Vario-Elmarit Lens
High Sensitivity

References

External links
DMC-FX150K on shop.panasonic.com
DMC-FX150S on shop.panasonic.com
Panasonic Lumix DMC-FX150 Review

Bridge digital cameras
FX150